Kenichi Yumoto (born 4 December 1984 in Wakayama, Wakayama Prefecture, Japan) is a Japanese freestyle wrestler. At the 2008 Summer Olympics in Beijing, he won the bronze medal in his category (60 kilograms).   His twin brother Shinichi is also an Olympic-medal winning wrestler.

References

External links
 

Living people
Japanese male sport wrestlers
Olympic wrestlers of Japan
Wrestlers at the 2008 Summer Olympics
Wrestlers at the 2012 Summer Olympics
Olympic silver medalists for Japan
1984 births
Olympic medalists in wrestling
Medalists at the 2008 Summer Olympics
Twin sportspeople
Japanese twins
World Wrestling Championships medalists
20th-century Japanese people
21st-century Japanese people